Russell K. Standish is a computational scientist based in Sydney, Australia. He was the founding director of UNSW's High Performance Computing Support Unit from 1997-2005. In 2005 he established a computational science consultancy called High Performance Coders. Since 2002, he has held an adjunct associate professorship with UNSW's School of Mathematics and Statistics.  He grew up in Western Australia with 2 younger brothers, Mark (middle child) and Tony (youngest). He is married to Kim Crichton with 1 child, named Hal.

Contributions

Ensemble theories of everything
In 2006, Standish published a book Theory of Nothing that takes a look at ensemble theories of everything, a subject reinvigorated by Max Tegmark in 1997. He has also been an extensive contributor to the Everything List, an informal discussion group on these ideas, and has published several papers in the area.

Complex systems, evolutionary systems, artificial life
Standish has been a longtime contributor to the study of evolutionary systems, an important subcategory of Complex Systems research. He often uses  Artificial Life models to explore evolutionary behaviour.

In 1998, he chaired Complex Systems '98, one of a series of conferences now known as the Asia Pacific Complex Systems conference.
In 2002, he chaired ALife VIII, The 8th International Conference on the Simulation and Synthesis of Living Systems.
He is the lead developer of EcoLab, an open source C++ based agent based modelling framework, as well as the Minsky visual simulation system.

Statistical mechanics of nonequilibrium systems
Standish's PhD involved research into nonequilibrium statistical mechanics.

External links
Home page
EcoLab

Living people
Year of birth missing (living people)
Scientists from Western Australia
Researchers of artificial life